Joseph Daly (28 December 1897–1941) was an English footballer who played in the Football League for Luton Town, Northampton Town and Notts County.

References

1897 births
1941 deaths
English footballers
Association football forwards
English Football League players
Cliftonville F.C. players
Notts County F.C. players
Northampton Town F.C. players
Luton Town F.C. players
Gillingham F.C. players